The following is a list of ecoregions in France as identified by the World Wide Fund for Nature (WWF).

Metropolitan France
The ecoregions of Metropolitan France are as follows:

Terrestrial ecoregions
Terrestrial ecoregions of Metropolitan France are listed by biome. All them are in the Palearctic realm.

Temperate broadleaf and mixed forests
 Atlantic mixed forests
 Cantabrian mixed forests
 Pyrenees conifer and mixed forests
 Western European broadleaf forests

Temperate coniferous forests
 Alps conifer and mixed forests

Mediterranean forests, woodlands, and scrub
 Corsican montane broadleaf and mixed forests (Corsica)
 Northeastern Spain and Southern France Mediterranean forests
 Tyrrhenian-Adriatic sclerophyllous and mixed forests (Corsica)

Freshwater ecoregions
 Cantabric Coast - Languedoc
 Central & Western Europe
 Italian Peninsula & Islands (Corsica)

Marine ecoregions
Marine ecoregions of France are listed by marine province. All of them are in the Temperate Northern Atlantic realm.

Northern European Seas province
 Celtic Seas
 North Sea

Lusitanian province
 South European Atlantic Shelf

Mediterranean Sea province
 Western Mediterranean

Overseas France
This is a list of all terrestrial ecoregions of France's overseas departments and territories.

Nearctic realm

Boreal forests/taiga
South Avalon-Burin oceanic barrens (Saint Pierre and Miquelon)

Neotropical realm

Deserts and xeric shrublands
 Leeward Islands xeric scrub (Guadeloupe, Saint Martin, Saint Barthelemy)
 Windward Islands xeric scrub (Martinique)

Mangroves
 Guianan mangroves (French Guiana)
 Lesser Antilles mangroves (Guadeloupe, Martinique)

Tropical and subtropical dry broadleaf forests
 Lesser Antillean dry forests (Martinique)

Tropical and subtropical moist broadleaf forests
 Guianan moist forests (French Guiana)
 Leeward Islands moist forests (Guadeloupe)
 Windward Islands moist forests (Martinique)

Afrotropical realm

Deserts and xeric shrublands
 Ile Europa and Bassas da India xeric scrub (Bassas da India, Europa Island)

Temperate grasslands and shrublands
 Amsterdam and Saint-Paul Islands temperate grasslands (Île Amsterdam, Île Saint-Paul)

Tropical and subtropical moist broadleaf forests
 Comoros forests (Mayotte)
 Mascarene forests (Réunion)

Australasian realm

Tropical and subtropical moist broadleaf forests
 New Caledonia rain forests (New Caledonia)

Tropical and subtropical dry broadleaf forests
 New Caledonia dry forests (New Caledonia)

Oceanian realm

Tropical and subtropical moist broadleaf forests
 Fiji tropical moist forests (Wallis and Futuna)
 Marquesas tropical moist forests (French Polynesia)
 Society Islands tropical moist forests (French Polynesia)
 Tuamotu tropical moist forests (French Polynesia)
 Tubuai tropical moist forests (French Polynesia)

Antarctic realm
 Southern Indian Ocean Islands tundra (Crozet Islands, Kerguelen Islands)

References 
 Abell, R., M. Thieme, C. Revenga, M. Bryer, M. Kottelat, N. Bogutskaya, B. Coad, N. Mandrak, S. Contreras-Balderas, W. Bussing, M. L. J. Stiassny, P. Skelton, G. R. Allen, P. Unmack, A. Naseka, R. Ng, N. Sindorf, J. Robertson, E. Armijo, J. Higgins, T. J. Heibel, E. Wikramanayake, D. Olson, H. L. Lopez, R. E. d. Reis, J. G. Lundberg, M. H. Sabaj Perez, and P. Petry. (2008). Freshwater ecoregions of the world: A new map of biogeographic units for freshwater biodiversity conservation. BioScience 58:403-414, .
 Spalding, Mark D., Helen E. Fox, Gerald R. Allen, Nick Davidson et al. "Marine Ecoregions of the World: A Bioregionalization of Coastal and Shelf Areas". Bioscience Vol. 57 No. 7, July/August 2007, pp. 573–583.

 
France
ecoregions